The Jefferson Apartment Building is an historic structure located in the Mount Vernon Triangle neighborhood of Washington, D.C.  The small middle-class apartment building was designed by George S. Cooper, who was a prolific apartment architect in the city.  The structure features a Romanesque Revival façade.  It was listed on the National Register of Historic Places in 1994.

References

External links

Apartment buildings in Washington, D.C.
Residential buildings completed in 1899
Residential buildings on the National Register of Historic Places in Washington, D.C.
Romanesque Revival architecture in Washington, D.C.
Apartment buildings on the National Register of Historic Places